Ricardo Luis Reis Nunes (born 13 November 1967) is a Brazilian businessman and politician who is the current mayor of São Paulo, having assumed office on 16 May 2021 following the death of mayor Bruno Covas. He is a member of the Brazilian Democratic Movement.

Career
Nunes was elected a city councillor for São Paulo in 2012 and 2016, having been part of the pro-government coalition of mayor Fernando Haddad, of the Workers' Party. While serving as a member of the Municipal Assembly, Nunes held positions on legislative inquiry committees such as a committee on banks, in 2019, which investigated tax evasion of social security services in the state capital.

In 2016 he supported amnesty of churches in irregular situation during zoning laws. 

Nunes gained notoriety in the media for being actively against the inclusion of sexuality and gender in the city education plan. He also authored a bill to create an aquatic transportation system at the Billings Reservoir. While the proposal is not very feasible, it was included in the goal plan of the city government.

In 2020, having been preparing a third run for city councillor, Nunes became the running mate of incumbent mayor and mayoral candidate Bruno Covas, in a coalition between the PSDB, MDB and DEM, part of a political maneuver by São Paulo state governor João Doria, a PSDB member, seeking an eventual support of the MDB in the 2022 elections.

As vice mayor, Nunes kept a low profile, appearing publicly only in the absence of Bruno Covas.

Mayor of São Paulo
On 2 May 2021, Nunes became acting mayor of São Paulo for 30 days, due to an administrative leave by the then incumbent mayor Bruno Covas due to treatment for cancer. After assuming office, it was reported that PSDB sought to persuade Nunes to switch to their party from MDB. However, Nunes rejected the idea of switching his party affiliation.

Covas died on 16 May 2021, and therefore Nunes permanently assumed office for the remainder of the term.

References

External links
  
 
 

|-

|-

|-

1967 births
Living people
People from São Paulo
Brazilian Democratic Movement politicians